Terminal Redux is the third album by the American thrash metal band Vektor, released on May 6, 2016. It is the band's first album released on Earache Records. The album is a concept album, which tells a sci-fi story about an astronaut finding the key to immortality and using it to gain vast political and financial power, but eventually experiencing an existential crisis as a result. Vocalist, guitarist and songwriter David DiSanto has also stated that the album was intended to serve as a concept album about the band itself. Terminal Redux is the final Vektor album to feature Frank Chin and Blake Anderson, as both left the band in December 2016. It was also Vektor's final album before they entered a four year-hiatus that same year.

Production and release
Vektor first played the song "Ultimate Artificer" live in August 2014, after roughly a year of writing new material. The band spent much of 2015 in the studio, recording the album. In November of that year, the band announced that their upcoming album would be entitled Terminal Redux, and released a studio version of "Ultimate Artificer". In February 2016, the band revealed the album's final release date, artwork, and track listing.

Reception

Terminal Redux received positive reviews from professional critics. Dom Lawson of Metal Hammer magazine placed the album 8th in his list of the top 10 metal albums of 2016. Stereogum list the album 20th on their list of the best 40 metal albums of 2016.

Track listing

Personnel

Vektor
David DiSanto – guitar, vocals
Erik Nelson – guitar
Frank Chin – bass guitar
Blake Anderson – drums

Additional personnel
Byron Filson – production, mixing, mastering
Daniel Kishbaugh – recording
Adam Burke – artwork
RoseMary Fiki – backing vocals on "Charging the Void" and "Recharging the Void"
Naeemah Z. Maddox – backing vocals on "Charging the Void" and "Recharging the Void"
Alex Poole – soundscapes

References

External links 

2016 albums
Vektor (band) albums
Earache Records albums
Concept albums